The 2019–20 season was Oldham Athletic's 125th season in their history and second consecutive season in the English football's fourth tier. Along with competing in League Two, the club also participated in the FA Cup, EFL Cup, and EFL Trophy.

The season covered the period from 1 July 2019 to 30 June 2020.

Transfers

Transfers in

Loans in

Loans out

Transfers out

Pre-season
The Latics announced pre-season friendlies against Raja Casablanca and Rochdale.

Competitions

League Two

League table

Results summary

Results by matchday

Matches
On Thursday, 20 June 2019, the EFL League Two fixtures were revealed.

FA Cup

The first round draw was made on 21 October 2019. The second round draw was made live on 11 November from Chichester City's stadium, Oaklands Park.

EFL Cup

The first round draw was made on 20 June.

EFL Trophy

On 9 July 2019, the pre-determined group stage draw was announced with Invited clubs to be drawn on 12 July 2019.

References

Oldham Athletic
Oldham Athletic A.F.C. seasons